Emlyn Williams (born 1903, date of death unknown) was a footballer who played in The Football League for Aberdare Athletic, Bournemouth, Hull City and Clapton Orient. He was born in Aberaman, Wales.

References

Welsh footballers
AFC Bournemouth players
Hull City A.F.C. players
Leyton Orient F.C. players
Aberdare Athletic F.C. players
English Football League players
1903 births
Year of death missing
Association football forwards